Felton is a town in Kent County, Delaware, United States. It is part of the Dover, Delaware Metropolitan Statistical Area. The population was 1,298 at the 2010 census.

History
Established in 1856 as a whistle stop along the Delaware Railroad, Felton was named after Samuel M. Felton Sr., then-president of the Philadelphia, Wilmington and Baltimore Railroad. As president, he was responsible for developing the Railroad in Delaware's rural areas, and by extension, the town's existence. Felton was incorporated on February 2, 1861, and passenger rail service would continue to the town until the early 1950s.

The Coombe Historic District, Thomas B. Coursey House, Felton Historic District, Felton Railroad Station, and Hughes Early Man Sites are listed on the National Register of Historic Places.

Geography
Felton is located at  (39.0084464, –75.5779807).

Infrastructure

Transportation

U.S. Route 13 runs north-south through Felton on Dupont Highway, heading north toward Dover and south toward Harrington. Delaware Route 12 runs east-west through Felton on Main Street, heading west toward Greensboro, Maryland and east toward Frederica. DART First State provides bus service to Felton along Route 117, which heads north toward Camden to connect to the local bus routes serving the Dover area and south toward Harrington. The Delmarva Central Railroad's Delmarva Subdivision line passes north-south through Felton.

Utilities
Delmarva Power, a subsidiary of Exelon, provides electricity to Felton. Chesapeake Utilities provides natural gas to the town. The Felton Water Department provides water to Felton, serving 550 homes, multiple businesses, and three schools. Trash and recycling collection in Felton is provided under contract by Waste Management.

Education
Public school students in Felton are served by the Lake Forest School District. Schools include Lake Forest High School as well as Lake Forest North, the elementary school (Grades K–3), and Lake Forest Central, the older elementary school (Grades 4–5). Other schools in the district are located in Harrington and Frederica.

Demographics

At the 2000 census there were 784 people in 297 households, including 217 families, in the town. The racial makeup of the town was 82.53% White, 11.61% African American, 1.02% Native American, 1.28% Asian, 0.89% from other races, and 2.68% from two or more races. Hispanic or Latino of any race were 2.17%.

Of the 297 households 42.1% had children under the age of 18 living with them, 48.5% were married couples living together, 18.5% had a female householder with no husband present, and 26.9% were non-families. 20.9% of households were one person and 9.4% were one person aged 65 or older.  The average household size was 2.63 and the average family size was 3.04.

The age distribution was 29.3% under the age of 18, 8.3% from 18 to 24, 36.9% from 25 to 44, 16.7% from 45 to 64, and 8.8% 65 or older.  The median age was 33 years. For every 100 females, there were 84.5 males.  For every 100 females age 18 and over, there were 82.2 males.

The median household income was $42,589 and the median family income  was $44,875. Males had a median income of $32,857 versus $24,375 for females. The per capita income for the town was $17,854.  About 9.5% of families and 10.4% of the population were below the poverty line, including 15.2% of those under age 18 and 13.8% of those age 65 or over.

See also
 List of towns in Delaware

References

External links

 

Towns in Kent County, Delaware
Towns in Delaware